Rajan Simkhada (Nepali: राजन सिंखडा; born 1977) is a Nepali entrepreneur, author, social worker and a comedian actor. He established a travel agency, Earthbound Expeditions in 1999. and is the founder of 'Mamata Volunteers'. His book 'हिँडे पुगिन्छ' describes his entrepreneurial journey, obstacles, dreams and success. His memorable roles in Nepali television are from comedy genre television series, Break Fail.

Rajan Simkhada was born on June 8, 1977 in Darkha, Dhading, Nepal.

Career

Entrepreneurial career 
Rajan Simkhada began his job as a receptionist in Thamel. He then studied a course from hospitality training center and became a tour guide in 1996. His travel agency, Earthbound Expeditions (founded in 1999) won TripAdvisor's Excellency Award in 2011 and continue. It was recommended by Lonely Planet, New York Times, The guardian, etc. His other ventures in the field of tourism were Hotel, Yoga Retreat, River Fun Beach Resort, food franchise 'Momo Hut' etc.

References 

1977 births
Living people
Nepalese male actors
Nepalese businesspeople
People from Dhading District
21st-century Nepalese businesspeople